Robert Clatworthy may refer to:

 Robert Clatworthy (art director), American art director
 Robert Clatworthy (sculptor), British sculptor